The 1972 Los Angeles Dodgers finished the season 85–70, good for a tie for second place with the Astros in the National League West division. This was the first season where the players' last names appeared on the back of the uniforms.

Offseason 
 October 21: Tommy Hutton was traded by the Dodgers to the Philadelphia Phillies for Larry Hisle.
 October 22, 1971: Bobby Darwin was traded by the Dodgers to the Minnesota Twins for Paul Powell.
 October 24, 1971: Maury Wills was released by the Dodgers.
 December 2, 1971: Doyle Alexander, Bob O'Brien, Sergio Robles and Royle Stillman were traded by the Dodgers to the Baltimore Orioles for Frank Robinson and Pete Richert.
 December 2, 1971: Dick Allen was traded by the Dodgers to the Chicago White Sox for Tommy John and Steve Huntz.
 December 2, 1971: Tom Haller was traded by the Dodgers to the Detroit Tigers for a player to be named later and cash. The Tigers completed the deal by sending Bernie Beckman (minors) to the Dodgers on March 31, 1972.
 December 17, 1971: Chris Cannizzaro was claimed off waivers by the Dodgers from the Chicago Cubs.
 March 27, 1972: Bill Sudakis was claimed off waivers from the Dodgers by the New York Mets.

Regular season

Season standings

Record vs. opponents

Opening Day lineup

Notable transactions 
 April 14, 1972: Dick Dietz was claimed off waivers by the Dodgers from the San Francisco Giants.

Roster

Player stats

Batting

Starters by position 
Note: Pos = Position; G = Games played; AB = At bats; H = Hits; Avg. = Batting average; HR = Home runs; RBI = Runs batted in

Other batters 
Note: G = Games played; AB = At bats; H = Hits; Avg. = Batting average; HR = Home runs; RBI = Runs batted in

Pitching

Starting pitchers 
Note: G = Games pitched; IP = Innings pitched; W = Wins; L = Losses; ERA = Earned run average; SO = Strikeouts

Other pitchers 
Note: G = Games pitched; IP = Innings pitched; W = Wins; L = Losses; ERA = Earned run average; SO = Strikeouts

Relief pitchers 
Note: G = Games pitched; W = Wins; L = Losses; SV = Saves; ERA = Earned run average; SO = Strikeouts

Awards and honors 
NL Player of the Month
Don Sutton (April 1972)

All-Stars 
1972 Major League Baseball All-Star Game
Don Sutton reserve
Gold Glove Awards
Wes Parker
Willie Davis

Farm system 

Teams in BOLD won League Championships

1972 Major League Baseball draft

This was the eighth year of a Major League Baseball Draft.  The Dodgers drafted 42 players in the June draft and eight in the January draft.

This was a weak draft class whose most notable player was Dennis Lewallyn, a pitcher who played for the Dodgers and two other teams from 1975 to 1981 with a 4–4 record and 4.48 ERA. The top draft pick was shortstop John Harbin from Newberry College who played in only 83 games in the Dodgers farm system in 1972 and was quickly out of baseball.

Notes

References 
Baseball-Reference season page
Baseball Almanac season page

External links 

1972 Los Angeles Dodgers uniform
Los Angeles Dodgers official web site

Los Angeles Dodgers seasons
Los Angeles Dodgers season
Los Angel